Zambia competed at the 1972 Summer Olympics in Munich, West Germany.

Athletics

Men
Track & road events

Women
Track & road events

Field events

Boxing

Men

References
Official Olympic Reports

Nations at the 1972 Summer Olympics
1972
1972 in Zambia